The Eclipse Sessions is an album by American singer-songwriter John Hiatt. It is his eighth studio release on the New West Records label. The album was partly recorded in August 2017 as the solar eclipse travelled across the U.S., hence the album title.

With Hiatt on lead vocals and guitar, he is joined by long-time collaborators Kenneth Blevins on drums and Patrick O'Hearn on bass. New to the team is producer and musician Kevin McKendree joining in on keyboards. McKendree has worked with Delbert McClinton, Lee Roy Parnell, Tinsley Ellis and Brian Setzer. McKendree's son Yates, who was only 16 at the time, adds lead guitar.

Track listing
All tracks written by John Hiatt.
 "Cry To Me" – 3:56
 "All The Way To The River" – 4:30
 "Aces Up Your Sleeve" – 3:22
 "Poor Imitation Of God" – 2:57
 "Nothing In My Heart" – 4:04
 "Over The Hill" – 4:21
 "Outrunning My Soul" – 3:43
 "Hide Your Tears" – 3:15
 "The Odds Of Loving You" – 4:06
 "One Stiff Breeze" – 3:41
 "Robber's Highway" – 4:24

Personnel
 John Hiatt – acoustic guitar, baritone guitar, electric guitar, vocals 
 Kenneth Blevens – drums
 Patrick O'Hearn – bass
 Yates McKendree – guitar, slide acoustic guitar
 Kevin McKendree – piano,  electric piano, organ

References 

2018 albums
John Hiatt albums
Roots rock albums